Gauge Changing may refer to:
 Axle exchange
 Bogie exchange
 Variable gauge
 Track gauge conversion
 Wheelset exchange